Guy Nosibor (born 22 July 1954) is a French former professional football player and manager. As a player, he was a forward and right winger.

Playing career 
Nosibor was born in Rivière-Salée in Martinique. He was a youth player of his hometown club L'Éclair de Rivière-Salée before joining Paris Saint-Germain in 1973. Pierre Bajoc, also playing for L'Éclair de Rivière-Salée at the time, joined PSG the same year. From 1973 to 1979, Nosibor would go on to make 42 appearances and score 6 goals across all competitions for the Parisian club. However, he did play for Angoulême on loan during the 1977–78 season.

In 1979, Nosibor joined Rennes, the club at which he would make the most appearances during his career. He continued his career at Corbeil-Essonnes, Grenoble, Le Puy, and Arles before retiring in 1989.

Managerial career 
After retiring, Nosibor became manager of Menton.

References

External links 
 
 

Living people
1954 births
People from Rivière-Salée
French footballers
French football managers
Association football forwards
Association football wingers
Martiniquais footballers
French people of Martiniquais descent
Black French sportspeople
Paris Saint-Germain F.C. players
Angoulême Charente FC players
Stade Rennais F.C. players
AS Corbeil-Essonnes (football) players
Grenoble Foot 38 players
Le Puy Foot 43 Auvergne players
AC Arlésien players
Ligue 2 players
Ligue 1 players
French Division 4 (1978–1993) players